During the 1995–96 English football season, Coventry City competed in the FA Premier League.

Season summary
Once again, Coventry City defied the odds after a season of struggle. This time they had the determination of manager Ron Atkinson and the regular supply of goals from Dion Dublin to thank for their survival. They hit the headlines in December with a spectacular 5–0 win over defending champions Blackburn, but the defence leaked too many goals for the Sky Blues to progress beyond 16th place in the final table, surviving only on goal difference to secure a 30th successive season of top flight football. Tragedy struck the club as promising defender David Busst suffered a harrowing broken-leg injury during a clash with Denis Irwin and Brian McClair from a corner in the 1-0 defeat at Manchester United, often considered one of the worst football injuries in history, which ultimately ended his career. He was diagnosed with MRSA later on from his injury in hospital, forcing him to premature retirement later that year.

New to the side for the season were defender Paul Williams from Derby County (not to be confused with another defender, Paul Williams, who departed the club the following week, nor with yet another Paul Williams, a Northern Irish forward who played for the club on loan from West Brom in the 92-93 season); Brazilian midfielder Isaías; and 21-year-old Leeds United striker Noel Whelan.

Atkinson splashed out more than £15 million on new players during the close season, as he looked to build a Coventry side which was capable of matching the high placing of his old club Aston Villa, one of Coventry's deadliest rivals.

Final league table

Results summary

Results by round

Results
Coventry City's score comes first

Legend

FA Premier League

FA Cup

League Cup

Squad

Left club during season

Reserve squad

Transfers

In

Out

Transfers in:  £6,150,000
Transfers out:  £2,425,000
Total spending:  £3,725,000

References

Coventry City F.C. seasons
Coventry City